The Al-Fattah Al-Aleem Mosque is a mosque in the New Administrative Capital in Egypt. It was inaugurated by Abdel Fattah el-Sisi, the president of Egypt, on 6 January 2019.

The mosque has a capacity of nearly 17,000 people and is considered Egypt's largest mosque. The mosque is located on the New Middle Ring Road in the New Capital and is considered the biggest mosque in Egypt and one of the mega mosques worldwide. It is built upon a total area of 44.55 ha (106 feddans). President Abdel Fattah El Sisi witnessed the inauguration ceremony of Al-Fattah Al-Aleem Mosque and the Nativity of the Christ Cathedral on the same day.

Size and construction 
With a landing field, car parking for 2650 cars, services and an administrative building that accommodates 60 workers for the mosque operation.

The Armed Forces Engineering Authority was keen on using the Egyptian marble in the mosque works and wanted the construction to be done by Egyptian workers only. The execution of the mosque was done in 15 months, starting on 16/6/2017 and within six months the concrete and construction works were done, the finishing works took 9 months starting from 1/4/2018 to 31/12/2018.

Architecture

Fencing works 
A total length of  3150 ml.

The minarets 
It is according to the Fatimid style, its total number 4 minarets with 95m height without the crown and the crescent; it is equivalent to 31 floors in height and each minaret has 4 balconies. The minarets are topped with stainless steel crescents treated with PVD to give it the golden brightful color with a height 4.5m.

The 21 domes

A main dome 
33m diameter, 44m height and total weight 5000 ton.

4 secondary domes 
11.75 diameter, 9m height  topping the mosque's ceil, 24m higher than the mosque's surface level. Beneath the secondary domes there are 4 domes from the stained glass.

6 domes above the entries 
7.5m diameter, 7m height above the entry ceil and 19m from the floor surface, beneath them there are 6 domes from the stained glass.

10 domes above the gates of the walls 
5m diameter, 3.10m height and a total solid height 15m from the bottom.

In addition to these, there is the outdoor prayer space built upon  and accommodates 3400 persons.

References

Mosques in Egypt
21st-century mosques
2019 establishments in Egypt
Mosques completed in 2019
21st-century religious buildings and structures in Egypt